Larry Davis (May 28, 1966 – February 20, 2008), later known as Adam Abdul-Hakeem, was an African–American man from New York City who gained notoriety in November 1986 for his shootout in the South Bronx with officers of the New York City Police Department, in which six officers were shot. Davis, asserting self-defense, was acquitted of all charges aside from illegal gun possession. Davis was later convicted in April 1991 of a Bronx drug dealer's 1986 murder. In 2008, Davis died via stabbing by a fellow inmate.

On November 19, 1986, nine New York City police officers, with nearly 20 outside the building, raided the Bronx apartment of Davis's sister. Davis escaped the ensuing shootout after a shotgun round creased his scalp, and all six officers who had been shot survived. Police explained the raid as an attempt to question Davis as a multiple-murder suspect, finally obtained an arrest warrant for that, and re-explained the raid as an attempt to arrest him. On a massive manhunt's 17th day, he was traced to a Bronx building, where he hid in an unknown family's unit. Telephoned by the police, he claimed to hold its occupants hostage. After night-long negotiations, convinced by media presence that police would not shoot, he surrendered peacefully.

Davis's legal defense, led by William Kunstler, contended that the raid was a pretense to murder Davis for knowledge of officers' alleged complicity in illicit drug sales and to punish him for abandoning his own drug dealing under them. In March 1988, on jury trial for a killing of four drug dealers—allegedly the 1986 raid's reason—Davis was acquitted. Then, in November, as to the nine raiding and six shot officers, his acquittal of aggravated assault and attempted murder triggered widespread outrage. About 1,000 New York City police officers publicly demonstrated. Yet for many others, Davis became a folk hero. Still others thought of him as an unsavory character, but probably truthful about the police and the shootout.

Serving five to 15 years on the November 1988 convictions for illegal gun possession, Davis was acquitted of another alleged drug dealer's murder. But in a third murder trial, about another alleged drug dealer, Davis was convicted, and sentenced to 25 years to life. After converting to Islam, he changed his name. Maintaining his innocence, he continued to allege that the police had framed him. A prevalent view attributes his infamous acquittal, rather, to racial bias by a proverbial "Bronx jury." But particularly with the Mollen Commission's 1990s exposure of widespread criminality, including drug dealing and violence, by New York City police officers, and then a 2003 independent documentary favoring Davis's explanation, his story continues to provoke divided reactions.

Biography

Early and personal life
An aspiring rapper, Davis was known by peers as musically talented, playing multiple instruments. He was also entrepreneurial, reputedly operating small music studios in the Bronx and Manhattan, while also repairing and modifying motorcycles. Davis's peers acknowledge that by midway through adolescence, Davis was dealing drugs, but claim that he ceased once the woman expecting his first child miscarried and then he learned of her crack use, which he blamed for the miscarriage. Davis had one child, a daughter Larrima Davis, born in 1986.

Problems with NYPD
Davis's arrest record, beginning in early 1983, included a 1984 robbery conviction and subsequent probation violation. By the November 1986 shootout, a court hearing for that  violation had been postponed four times. Soon after the successful manhunt, the Bronx District Attorney's office alleged that, as The New York Times then paraphrased, "Davis was part of a small, loosely organized, 'very violent' group of gunmen who have robbed, assaulted and slain drug dealers in the Bronx and northern Manhattan in recent months".

Approaching trial, the district attorney's office had one witness outside of law enforcement: Roy L. Gray, who admitted under oath to steering "traffic to coke spots." Allegedly, on October 26, 1986, in Manhattan's Washington Heights section, Gray was robbed of $2, and four days later, October 30, in the borough's Harlem section, spotted the robber, later understood as Davis, about to rob some cocaine dealers, too.  Reportedly, Gray thus alerted the police, and then rode in the police car that chased the getaway car, carrying Davis and two other men, to the Bronx's Highbridge section, where, along Jerome Avenue, upon issuing three gunshots at the police, the three men evaded arrest by vanishing into an apartment building.

In early November, acting on a tip, police sought Davis but failed to find him at his sister's apartment at 1231 Fulton Avenue in the Bronx's Morrisania section. They returned to the apartment on November 19, when the infamous shootout occurred. After it, the police department explained the raid as an effort to question him, but later re-explained it as an attempt to arrest him, albeit without an arrest warrant. Months later, after the police alleged a Jerome Avenue car chase with gunshots fired at police 20 days before the infamous raid, "officials from the Bronx District Attorney's office and the Police Department deflected questions about why no warrant had been issued for Mr. Davis's arrest after the Jerome Avenue incident. Each agency referred questions to the other." At some point, a senior police official argued that "once you move to introduce an accusatory instrument, you lose the benefit of being able to talk to that person."

In any case, the police reported that Gray, as a robbery victim of Davis, examined photos and provided the "positive identification" of Davis, that Davis's fingerprints were in the getaway car, that two shell casings, recovered from the scene, matched the pistol on Davis at his December 6 arrest, and that ballistics tests tied this gun to the killings of four suspected drug dealers in Manhattan just hours before the October 30 car chase from Manhattan to the Bronx. Davis maintained, instead, that the police had framed him for these murders. 

Similarly, Davis's attorneys William Kunstler and Lynne Stewart as well as Davis's peers and family all contended that, five years before the shootout, certain police officers had recruited Davis, age 15, to deal drugs under their sponsorship, and then turned a blind eye to the dealing of Davis's associates who began working under him; but then began harassing them and communicating death threats for Davis once he stopped dealing drugs in late 1986 while withholding drug proceeds, reputedly some $40,000.

1986 Shootout and escape
On the evening of Wednesday, November 19, 1986, acting on a tip, an NYPD team of 27 from the 41st Precinct and the Emergency Service Unit, the ESU, converged on the six-story apartment building at 1231 Fulton Avenue where two of Davis's sisters had adjoining apartments on the ground floor. At about 8:30 p.m., 15 officers surrounded the building and 12 others entered; nine of these went to the three-room apartment of Davis's sister Regina Lewis and seven entered it. Inside were Davis, his girlfriend, his sister, her husband, and four children. Lewis's two infant children were asleep in the bedroom at the rear.

Interviewed the next day, Regina Lewis reportedly once she answered a door knock, the police entered the living room with guns drawn, ordered the adults to get the children out, and called, "Come out, Larry, you don't have a chance—we've got you surrounded." At trial, the police alleged that Davis had fired first. The jury believed the events presented by the defense, in which an officer entered the apartment with a shotgun and fired at Davis, while he was seated behind a desk holding his baby. The officer, thinking he had hit Davis, was then shot in the neck by Davis with a handgun.

The police took cover, returning fire as they retreated. In the confusion, no one kept track of Davis, who slipped into his other sister's apartment and escaped out a back window. Lewis had complained to her brother about him bringing guns to the apartment and told him to get out. He left but returned. She quoted him as telling her, "If I'm caught in the street, the police are going to shoot me. But I am going to shoot them first."

Police collected the shotgun and the expended shells from the .45-caliber pistol that Davis took with him. A .32-caliber revolver and .357 Magnum pistol were also left behind. Ballistics tests would allegedly later link the .32-caliber revolver to the Manhattan drug dealer killing and the .45 caliber pistol to the four dead Bronx dealers. A police official said that all escape routes had been covered by officers but none apparently saw Davis leave. He also said that the wounded officers were unable to return fire effectively due to the presence in the apartment of the two infants and other bystanders. Davis fired four shotgun rounds and nine .45 caliber pistol shots; the police fired four shotgun rounds and 20 pistol shots. Neither Davis nor the two infants with him in the bedroom were wounded.

In the following year, three of the wounded officers accused the NYPD of "negligent" and "reckless" planning and execution of the raid, and blamed the Bronx detectives for creating "chaos" by bursting into the apartment before Emergency Service Unit officers could seal off escape routes.

Search and capture
The six wounded officers were carried across the street to the Bronx-Lebanon Hospital and the manhunt began. The surrounding area and the rest of the building were searched immediately. Police stakeouts were set up at terminals, bridges and tunnels leading out of the city and a nationwide alarm was issued. As the manhunt spread, raids were staged in Chicago, Albany, Newark and other cities where Davis had relatives or friends. A man who said he was Davis called ABC-TV, expressing fears he would be beaten by police and stating he would not be taken alive.

Acting on a tip that Davis had been seen entering his mother's home four days after the escape, police searched the building while interviewing Mary Davis in a laundromat across the street. She suffered an apparent heart attack shortly thereafter. As she recuperated three days later, she urged her son to call the NAACP, who had offered to help arrange a safe surrender.

On the afternoon of December 5, 1986, police received another tip that Davis had been seen entering the Bronx housing project where his sister Margaret lived. They surrounded the 14-story building, closed off local streets and posted sharpshooters on nearby rooftops. After searching his sister's second-floor apartment, police began a systematic canvass of all 312 units. At some point during the day, Davis forced his way at gunpoint into Apartment 14-EB, where Elroy and Sophia Sewer lived with their two daughters, just as neighbor Theresa Ali, and her 2-year-old son, arrived for a visit.

Mr. Sewer arrived home at 8 P.M. to find his family and the neighbors being held hostage by Mr. Davis. At 11:45 p.m. Davis released the two visitors and sent Mr. Sewer out to pick up food from a nearby Chinese restaurant. He also ordered Mr. Sewer to call Mr. Davis' mother's and sister's tapped telephones and give false location information. When the husband returned with the food he was stopped for questioning by the police and, at 12:45 a.m., informed them that his wife and two daughters were being held hostage by Mr. Davis.

Police set up a command post in a nearby apartment and by 1:30 a.m. had established telephone contact. At one point, Davis threatened to kill the hostages with a hand grenade, at other points he chatted with negotiators about stereo equipment, asked about a lawyer, and showed concern for his own safety, saying that he was afraid police would harm him. Throughout, negotiators repeated "There is no use running, you have nowhere to hide now." To assure Davis that he would not be harmed, police showed him the press credentials of three reporters in a nearby apartment and allowed him to speak to his girlfriend. At about 7 a.m. Larry Davis laid down his .45-caliber pistol and surrendered. As he was taken from the building in handcuffs, residents leaned out of their windows, clapped, and chanted Davis's name.

Murder and attempted murder trials
The Bronx County District Attorney, along with the District Attorney in Manhattan and in Long Island, had many charges against Larry Davis. They included weapons possession, murder of drug dealers, attempted murder of police, kidnapping, and automobile theft. Despite three trials in two years, prosecutors were unable to convince a jury of that Larry Davis was guilty for any but the weapons charge—the ones he used in shooting the police officers—until a jury convicted him and his brother, Eddie Davis, in the August 1986 killing of a drug dealer.

March 1988 acquittal for the killing of four Bronx drug dealers
The four killings occurred in October 1986. The prosecution, contending that Davis was a crack dealer who specialized in the armed robbery of rival crack dealers, called over 50 witnesses, encompassing ballistic evidence and fingerprints on a cash box placing Davis at the crime scene. Davis's attorneys William Kunstler and Lynne Stewart, in their opening and closing arguments, contended that the prosecution's evidence was fabricated, framing Davis to excuse the infamous raid.

They contended Davis had been recruited into a drug ring by rogue police officers, aiming to kill him in the raid. The jury found conflicting testimony from witnesses, and discrepancies in times stated by prosecution witnesses. After deliberating for nine days—then the longest in Bronx history for a single defendant—the jury acquitted Davis.

November 1988 acquittal for shooting of nine police officers
Davis faced numerous charges from the infamous shootout, where he shot six police officers: nine counts of attempted murder, six counts of aggravated assault, eight counts of criminal weapons possession, and two counts of criminal firearm use. Convicted only on criminal weapons possession, Davis was sentenced to 5 to 15 years in prison. During jury selection, the defense accused the prosecution of refusing black women, likely to empathize with Davis. The judge ruled that the defense, likewise abusing peremptory challenges, had excluded white jurors on racial reasoning. Dismissing the first six seated jurors, then, Judge Fried declared a mistrial. 

A second mistrial was declared, at the request of both sides, once the new jury's only white member expressed concern that acquitting Davis would subject him to harassment by police. Finally seated was a jury of ten blacks and two Hispanics. During trial, ballistic experts incriminated the .45-caliber pistol allegedly seized at Davis's capture. Several wounded officers, including "point man" Thomas McCarren, who had entered first, identified Davis as the shooter. McCarren testified that once he entered the apartment, Davis rose from a sofa and, carrying a handgun, ran down a narrow hall to a back bedroom, prompting pursuit by McCarren, who next sustained gunfire to his mouth upon seeing Davis fire the pistol at him. But a 12-gauge shotgun slug was embedded in the bedroom's dresser drawer.

The defense implicated that McCarren, carrying a shotgun, had fired first, missing Davis but putting the slug in the dresser drawer. McCarren countered that he had earlier given his shotgun to a detective assigned to cover the building's rear, and himself had only a 38-caliber revolver while entering the apartment. In any case, the defense contended that Davis, knowing that police officers sought to kill him, shot in self-defense. They charged that police officers were corrupt and involved in the drug trade. Davis's mother testified that two weeks before the raid, a police officer had pushed her and threatened to kill him. She testified, further, that she had warned her son, and had complained to the police department's Civilian Complaint Review Board, which sustained her complaint. 

On November 20, 1988, after deliberating 38 hours over five days, the jury acquitted Davis of all charges, except six counts of criminal possession of a weapon. Interviewed afterward, the jury forewoman said Davis was a "young and innocent kid who got recruited by a few corrupt policemen." McCarren, most seriously wounded, forced into retirement, called it "a racist verdict," and added, "The day this happened, a bunch of good honest police officers went to lock up Larry Davis because he had killed people, and not for anything else." Defense attorney Kunstler said, "The jury understood what happened—that he acted in self-defense." Defense attorney Stewart quipped, "I really think that the black community is no longer going to have black Sambos—they're going to have black Rambos."

December 1989 acquittal for the murder of a Harlem drug dealer
Victor Lagombra, reputedly a "mid-level" crack dealer in Harlem, Manhattan, was murdered in September 1986. Davis went on trial for the murder in October 1989. The prosecution accused Davis of robbing two drug dealers when surprised by Lagombra walking into the apartment, prompting Davis's "cold-blooded act of savagery." Ballistics tests tied Davis's 32-caliber revolver to the killing. Two defense witnesses testified that, on the day of the murder, Davis was in Florida making a rap album. 

After the five-week trial, the jury returned from its three-day deliberation in December 1989, with the verdict: not guilty. Although not Davis's attorney in this case, William Kunstler repeated that Davis had helped rogue police officers sell drugs, and said that the chronic accusations against Davis reflect a conspiracy.

March 1991 conviction for the murder of a Bronx drug dealer
Raymond Vizcaino, reputedly a drug dealer in the Bronx, was murdered in August 1986. In January 1987, Davis's older brother Eddie Davis was arrested and charged. Allegedly, Eddie and Larry, along with two others, attempting robbery at a Webster Avenue apartment, shot through the door, killing Vizcaino. A jury convicted Eddie Davis in June 1989. 

Larry Davis's trial began five months later. In March 1991, the jury found him guilty. Already serving 5 to 15 years on weapons convictions, Davis received another 25 years to life. Once sentenced, creating a loud scene until the judge expelled him, Davis spoke for about an hour, airing again his longstanding complaint that the police and the judicial system were conducting a vendetta against him.

Death
Davis was serving his sentence at Shawangunk Correctional Facility near the Ulster County 
hamlet of Wallkill. At approximately 7 p.m. on February 20, 2008, a correctional officer overseeing the block yard noticed inmates congregating around an argument between two inmates. When the officer went to break it up, he found Davis using his walking cane to fend off an inmate from attacking him with a 9 inch (23 cm) long metal shiv. Davis was unsuccessful and was stabbed numerous times.

The officer called for assistance. The attacker was restrained and taken to the Special Housing Unit to remain in segregated custody. Davis was taken to the facility infirmary where first aid was rendered. Davis lost much blood, lost consciousness and eventually showed no vital signs. Not being a trauma level infirmary, the supervising nurse called for an emergency transport by ambulance to St. Luke's Hospital in nearby Newburgh, where he was pronounced dead on arrival.

After questioning by the state police and the New York State Department of Correctional Services's (DOCS) inspector general's office, another inmate, Luis Rosado, an alleged self-made Crip, 42, from the Lower East Side of Manhattan was charged with murder.

Rosado was already serving a sentence of 25 years to life for murder and assault charges in the early 1980s, and had been denied parole in 2007. He was arraigned at Shawangunk Town Court the next morning. DOCS officials said both he and Davis had long disciplinary records, including fights with other inmates, but there was no record of any previous violence between the two.

In July 2008, an Ulster County grand jury indicted Rosado on nine felony charges related to the stabbing, including three different counts of murder, assault, criminal possession of a weapon and possession of prison contraband. The murder charges carried a potential sentence of life without parole. After his arrest, Rosado was moved to Clinton Correctional Facility, located in upstate New York close to the Canadian border. In February 2009, Luis Rosado pleaded guilty to first-degree manslaughter in Ulster County Court and was sentenced to an additional 10 years in prison, to be served consecutively with his current 25-to-life sentence for murder.
Rosado was later paroled in 2021.  Following his parole, Rosado stated in an interview with VladTV via YouTube that Davis was not the intended stabbing target, and that Rosado was attempting to stab a child molester but Davis got in the middle of the altercation.

References

1966 births
1986 murders in the United States
2008 deaths
2008 murders in the United States
American people who died in prison custody
Attacks in the United States in 1986
Criminals from New York City
Deaths by stabbing in New York (state)
Male murder victims
Mass shootings in New York City
Murdered African-American people
Murdered criminals
People acquitted of attempted murder
People convicted of illegal possession of weapons
People acquitted of murder
People convicted of murder by New York (state)
People murdered in New York (state)
Prisoners murdered in custody
Prisoners who died in New York (state) detention
Suspected serial killers